Guido Sebastián Di Fonzo (born 13 June 1996) is an Argentine professional footballer who plays as a defender for Deportivo Español.

Career
Di Fonzo started his career in Primera B Metropolitana with Deportivo Español. He made his professional debut on 2 May 2018 during a goalless draw with Comunicaciones, which was his only appearance of the 2017–18 season. Di Fonzo returned to their first-team set-up in the succeeding October, appearing for the full duration of fixtures with All Boys and Fénix. Three months later, he was demoted back into the reserves.

Career statistics
.

References

External links

1996 births
Living people
Place of birth missing (living people)
Argentine footballers
Association football defenders
Primera B Metropolitana players
Deportivo Español footballers